Pontdolgoch railway station was a station in Pontdolgoch, Powys, Wales. The station opened on 3 January 1863 and closed on 14 June 1965.

References

Sources

Disused railway stations in Powys
Railway stations in Great Britain closed in 1863
Railway stations in Great Britain closed in 1965
Former Cambrian Railway stations
Beeching closures in Wales
Grade II listed buildings in Powys
Grade II listed railway stations in Wales